Third Age of the Sun is the third studio album released by the Finnish heavy metal band Battlelore, released in 2005. As on previous albums, the songs are all based on J. R. R. Tolkien's Middle-earth sagas. This album introduced new bass player Timo Honkanen and new vocalist Tomi Mykkänen, who had previously toured with the band when Miika Kokkola and Patrik Mennander had been unavailable. The sound of the album differs from the first two Battlelore albums, as the instrumentation has a more live and organic feel and also due to the absence of clean male vocals.

The album peaked at position 38 in The Official Finnish Charts.

Track listing

Credits
Band members
Kaisa Jouhki - vocals
Tomi Mykkänen - vocals
Jussi Rautio - guitar, acoustic guitars
Jyri Vahvanen - guitar
Timo Honkanen - bass
Henri Vahvanen - drums
Maria Honkanen - keyboards

Production
Terje Refsnes - producer, engineer, mixing
Miitri Aaltonen - additional pre-production
Tommi Havo - additional growl-vocals arrangements
Mika Jussila - mastering at Finnvox Studios

Lyrical references
 "Usvainen Rhûn" refers titular to the land of Rhûn.
 "Ghân of the Woods" is about Ghân-buri-Ghân and the Drúedain.
 "Gwaith-i-Mírdain" tells about the elven smiths who forged the Rings of Power.
 "Trollshaws" is about the encounter in the troll-woods, from The Hobbit.
 "Valier - Queens of the Valar" is about the Queens of the Valar.
 "Thousand Caves" is about the Thousand Caves of Menegroth in Doriath.
 "Cloaked in Her Unlight" tells about Ungoliant and the destruction of the Two Trees of Valinor.
 "Of Orcs and Elves" is about the breeding of Orcs from Elves.
 "Touch of Green and Gold" is about Tom Bombadil.
 "Pallando - Forgotten Wizards I" is about Pallando, one of the Blue Wizards.
 "Gollum's Cry" is about Gollum during The Two Towers.
 "Elessar's Call" is about the gifts Aragorn receives to aid the Fellowship.
 "Alatar - Forgotten Wizards II" is about Alatar, one of the Blue Wizards.
 "Dwimmerlaik" is a dialogue-like song between Éowyn and the Witch-king of Angmar.

References

External links
 Battlelore Official Homepage

Battlelore albums
Napalm Records albums
2005 albums